This is a list of lighthouses in Peru. It includes those maritime lighthouses that are located on the islands and the Pacific coastline of the country, which are named landfall lights, or have a range of at least fifteen nautical miles.  Peru also has a number of lighthouses on the western side of Lake Titicaca, these are listed separately.

Maritime lighthouses

Lake Titicaca lights

There are six Peruvian lighthouses that aid navigation on the lake.

See also
 Lists of lighthouses and lightvessels

References

External links

 

Peru
Lighthouse
Lighthouses